David Lonsdale (born 21 May 1963) is an English actor. He is best known for playing Peter Barlow in Coronation Street and David Stockwell in the ITV period police drama series Heartbeat.

Career

Television
Lonsdale's first major role on television occurred in 1986 when he played Peter Barlow in Coronation Street. He has subsequently re-appeared in the show on two further occasions. He first returned in 2011 in a minor role working for a solicitor and again in May 2012, this time playing Edwin Soames.

Other, more minor television appearances, have seen Lonsdale take roles in the 1989 Inspector Morse episode Driven to Distraction in which he played a Detective; in the medical drama Casualty (2011) and in the soap opera Emmerdale (2018) in which he played a private detective.

Lonsdale has also twice appeared in the drama series Vera, again in the role of a Policeman, and as pub landlord Phil Annerly in the episode ‘Dirty’ (2020) and in The Bay (2022). He has also made an appearance in the ITV drama series Anne.

Film
Lonsdale had a minor role as a repo man in the 1997 feature film The Full Monty. In 2019 he appeared as a Desk Sergeant in the movie Downton Abbey.

Theatre
Lonsdale appeared in the pantomime Dick Whittington at the Gracie Fields Theatre, Rochdale, in 2018 - 2019. In recent years Lonsdale has played the part of Gordon Bennett in Uncle Eric musical comedy plays at the New Vic Theatre in Newcastle-under-Lyme.

Personal life
Lonsdale married his wife Diana in 1993. Together they have three children.

Lonsdale now presents a Sunday morning show, The Southport Arts Show, on community radio station Mighty FM. Lonsdale is a regular guest at the annual Heartbeat Car Rally in Goathland where he spends time meeting and greeting fans, usually with his co-star Tricia Penrose.

Filmography

Film

Television

References

External links

Don't be fooled by Dales' 'village idiot' Manchester Evening News
David Lonsdale in Coronation Street corrie.net

1963 births
Living people
English male television actors
People educated at King George V College
English radio personalities
English male film actors
Male actors from Lancashire
People from Southport
20th-century English male actors
21st-century English male actors